Goundaka is a village and seat of the commune of Pignari Bana in the Cercle of Bandiagara of Mopti Region of southern-central Mali.

References

Populated places in Mopti Region